The Virgin and Child with Saint Andrew and Saint Peter is an oil on canvas painting from the studio of Cima da Conegliano, from c. 1510, now in the National Galleries of Scotland, in Edinburgh.

References

1510 paintings
Paintings depicting Saint Peter
Paintings depicting Andrew the Apostle
Paintings in the National Galleries of Scotland

Unfinished paintings